Cathleen M. Crudden is a Canadian chemist. She is a Canada Research Chair in Metal Organic Chemistry at Queen's University at Kingston. In February 2021, she took up the role of Editor-in-chief at ACS Catalysis.

Education 
Crudden earned a Bachelors of Science at the University of Toronto in 1989, working with Mark Lautens, with whom she went on to complete her master's degree. She moved to University of Ottawa for her PhD, working under the supervision of Howard Alper, which she completed in 1995.

Research and career 
Crudden was appointed a Natural Sciences and Engineering Research Council postdoctoral fellow at University of Illinois at Urbana–Champaign working with Scott E. Denmark in 1995. She moved to University of New Brunswick in 1996 where she started her own research group. In 2002, she was appointed a Queen's National Scholar and moved her research lab to Kingston, Ontario.

Crudden was the first to identify an enantiospecific Suzuki-Miyaura cross-coupling reaction of chiral boranes. In 2014 she designed more stable nitrogen-based self-assembled monolayer treatments for metal surfaces. The N-heterocyclic carbene self-assembled monolayers can be used in a range of applications, including biosensors. Her interests lie in hydroboration, organometallic chemistry, chiral materials and persistent carbenes. In 2010 Crudden became head of a Natural Sciences and Engineering Research Council CREATE award in chiral materials, worth $1.6 million. She became President of the Canadian Society of Chemistry.

In 2015, as Principal Investigator of a group of ten collaborators, Crudden was awarded $8.8 million from the Canada Foundation for Innovation for major infrastructure purchases. She won the Queen's University Research Opportunities Fund, which she used to create inexpensive, sensitive biosensors. Her group prepares carbon-based ligands for metal surfaces, which can be used as sensing systems based on surface plasmon resonance. In 2016, she and Dr. Suning Wang held a trilateral Canada-Japan-Germany symposium at Queen's looking at Elements Functions for Transformative Catalysis and Materials. Crudden is a joint Professor at the Institute of Transformative Bio-Molecules, based out of Nagoya University in Japan, where she runs a satellite lab. She is one of only four international collaborators at this Institute. She was recognised as having made the most distinguished contribution to the field of catalysis by the Chemical Institute of Canada in 2018, when they awarded her the Catalysis Award. Crudden also often comments on developments in the field of organic chemistry in various media outlets.

Awards 

 2022 Alfred Bader Award
 2020 Royal Society of Canada
 2019 Montreal Medal
 2019 American Chemical Society Arthur C. Cope Scholar Award
 2018 Queen's University prize for Excellence in Research
 2018 Chemical Institute of Canada Catalysis Award
 2018 Precious Metal Institute Carol Tyler Award
 2017 Canadian Society for Chemistry R.U. Lemieux Award

References

Living people
Canadian women chemists
Organic chemists
University of Toronto alumni
University of Ottawa alumni
Scientists from Belfast
Northern Ireland emigrants to Canada
20th-century Canadian chemists
20th-century Canadian women scientists
21st-century Canadian chemists
21st-century Canadian women scientists
Canada Research Chairs
Year of birth missing (living people)